Butabika is a location in south-eastern Kampala, the capital city of Uganda.

Location
Butabika is bordered by Bweyogerere to the north, Kirinnya, a Ward in Kira Municipality to the east, Luzira and Port Bell to the south, Mutungo to the west and Kireka in Kira Municipality to the northwest. The coordinates of Butabika are:0°19'12.0"N, 32°39'27.0"E (Latitude:0.3200; Longitude:32.6575).

Overview
Butabika is the location of the largest mental health hospital in Uganda, with an estimated bed capacity of 900. Butabika National Referral Hospital is the country's only referral hospital specializing in mental health. In 2005, about half of that land was sold to private individuals and institutional developers. One of those developers is Nationwide Properties, a subsidiary of Property Services Limited, develops and sells new homes as well as providing multiple facilities to the area.

Points of interest
The following points of interest lie in Butabika or near its borders:
 Butabika National Referral Hospital - The largest mental health facility in Uganda and the only national mental health referral hospital in the country, admitting in excess of 6,000 mental health patients annually.
 The Institute of Clinical Psychiatric Officers (ICPO) - A Uganda Government-owned school that trains Clinical Psychiatric Officers, administered by the Uganda Ministry of Health.
 Biina Catholic Cathedral - A place of worship affiliated with the Catholic Church.
 Royal Palms Housing Estate - An upscale private real estate development by the Mukwano Group of Companies.

See also

References

External links
Kampala City Guide
Butabika National Referral Hospital Homepage

Neighborhoods of Kampala
Populated places on Lake Victoria
Nakawa Division